"Be Good or Be Gone" is a song by the Irish folk musician Fionn Regan. It is the opening track and lead single from Regan's debut studio album, The End of History, and was released on 5 February 2006 on Bella Union.

Track listings

Personnel
All personnel credits adapted from The End of Historys liner notes.

Performer
Fionn Regan – vocals, guitar, backing vocals, producer, mixing

Technical personnel
Karl Odlum – engineer
Simon Raymonde – mixing
Finn Eiles – mixing engineer
Denis Blackham – mastering

References

External links
 

2006 singles
2006 songs